The 2005 Recopa Sudamericana (officially the 2005 Recopa Fox Sports Sudamericana for sponsorship reasons) was the 13th Recopa Sudamericana, an annual football match between the winners of the previous season's Copa Libertadores and Copa Sudamericana competitions. From this edition forward, the Recopa Sudamericana will be contested over two legs.

The match was contested by Once Caldas, winners of the 2004 Copa Libertadores, and Boca Juniors, winners of the 2004 Copa Sudamericana and appearing in a second, consecutive final. In a rematch of the Copa Libertadores final in 2004, Boca Juniors managed to avenge that defeat and win their second Recopa Sudamericana after beating Once Caldas 4-3 on goal aggregate.

Qualified teams

Venues

Match details

First leg

Second leg

External links 
Official webpage 
Official rules 
Recopa Sudamericana 2005 at RSSSF

Recopa Sudamericana
Football in Buenos Aires
Rec
Recopa Sudamericana 2005
Recopa Sudamericana 2005